Yılmaz Özlem (born 1 June 1972) is a Turkish former professional footballer who played as a defensive midfielder.

Notes 

1972 births
Living people
Turkish footballers
İnegölspor footballers
Gaziantepspor footballers
Adana Demirspor footballers
Diyarbakırspor footballers
Adanaspor footballers
Bucaspor footballers
Göztepe S.K. footballers
Association football midfielders
MKE Ankaragücü footballers